Horatio Allen (May 10, 1802 – December 31, 1889) was an American civil engineer and inventor, and President of Erie Railroad in the year 1843–1844.

Biography 
Born in Schenectady, New York, he graduated from Columbia University in 1823, and was appointed Assistant Engineer of the Delaware and Hudson Canal Company (precursor to the railroad). In 1827 he quit the Canal Company and went to England to study the emerging rail road technology, particularly locomotives. He was therefore asked to arrange for the construction of 3 locomotives for the Canal Company's projected railway (as per his June 25, 1880 letter to the editor of the New York Times). There he made the acquaintance of engineer George Stephenson. In 1829 he operated the first steam locomotive, one of the ones he ordered for the D&H, to run in America, the Stourbridge Lion, which ran successfully at Honesdale, Pennsylvania on August 8, 1829.
 
From 1829 to 1834 he was the chief engineer of the South Carolina Canal and Rail Road Company, at that time the longest railway in the world (about 136 miles/218 km). He was the inventor of the so-called "swiveling truck" for railway cars. He wrote: The Railroad Era; First Five Years of its Development (1884).

In his other activities, from 1838 to 1842 he was principal assistant engineer of the Croton Aqueduct, the major water supply system for New York City; in 1842 he became connected with the Novelty Iron Works, a major builder of marine steam and other engines; at various times chief engineer and president of the Erie Railway; consulting engineer for the Panama Railway and the Brooklyn Bridge; and in 1872 and 1873 was president of the American Society of Civil Engineers.

In 1924 the Delaware and Hudson Railway built its first experimental high-pressure locomotive, No. 1400 and named it "Horatio Allen".

Publications 
 
 M. N. Forney, Memoir of Horatio Allen (reprinted from the Railroad and Engineering Journal)

See also 
List of railroad executives

References

External links 
 The Lemelson Center for the Study of Invention & Innovation

American railroad pioneers
Columbia School of Engineering and Applied Science alumni
Delaware and Hudson Railway
Erie Railroad
American railroad mechanical engineers
Businesspeople from Schenectady, New York
19th-century American railroad executives
1802 births
1889 deaths
American civil engineers
19th-century American engineers
Engineers from New York (state)
Engineers from New Jersey